Jesse Lee Barfield (born October 29, 1959) is an American former professional baseball player and coach. He played in Major League Baseball as an right fielder from 1981 to 1992 for the Toronto Blue Jays and the New York Yankees. 

A two-time Gold Glove Award winner, Barfield was a strong defensive player featuring an impressive throwing arm that allowed him to lead the American League (AL) five times in outfielder assists. He ended his playing career ranked second only to Baseball Hall of Fame member, Chuck Klein, in outfielder assists per 1,000 innings. He was also provided strong offense, winning a Silver Slugger Award and leading the American League in home runs in 1986, the same year he was named to the American League All-Star team. 

Injuries prematurely ended Barfield's major league career after just 11 seasons. He played his final season of professional baseball in 1993 with the Yomiuri Giants of the Nippon Professional Baseball league. After his playing career he worked as a major league coach for the Houston Astros, Texas Rangers and the Seattle Mariners.

Career

Toronto Blue Jays (1981–1989)
Selected by the Blue Jays in the ninth round of the 1977 amateur draft, Barfield debuted in the Majors in 1981, hitting .232 in just 25 games. He was a regular the following season and hit .246 with 18 home runs and 58 RBI, including the first pinch hit grand slam in Blue Jays franchise history. He finished eighth in American League Rookie of the Year voting and solidified himself as a regular in the lineup for years to come.

In 1983, Barfield hit .253 with 27 home runs and 58 RBI. The following year, he increased his average to .284 with 14 home runs and 49 RBI. Barfield combined with George Bell and Lloyd Moseby to form what many analysts considered the best all-around outfields of the 1980s for the Blue Jays.

In 1985, Barfield batted .289 with an on base percentage of .369 and a slugging percentage of .536, which was 42 percent higher than the league average or adjusted OPS+. He hit for both power and speed, with 27 homers, 22 stolen bases, 22 assists and achieved 6.8 Wins Above Replacement. His batting average was a career-high, and he became the first Blue Jays player to hit 20 homers and steal 20 bases in the same season. That season Toronto reached the playoffs for the first time in franchise history. In his only playoff competition—the American League Championship Series (ALCS)—Barfield batted .280 with one home run, four RBI, and one stolen base.

Despite the Blue Jays' failure to defend their 1985 division title, Barfield enjoyed his best personal season in 1986. He collected career-highs in batting average (.289, tying the previous season), 40 home runs, 108 RBI, 107 runs, 170 hits, 35 doubles, and wRC+ (147). His 40 homers led the major leagues and set a team record that lasted one year. Also, Barfield won both a Gold Glove Award and a Silver Slugger Award, and he was selected to the American League All-Star team.

The 1987 season saw Barfield play in a career-high 159 games, hitting .263 with 28 home runs and 84 RBI. He also won his second Gold Glove that year. The following year, his average dipped to .244 with 18 home runs and 56 RBI. In 1989, he hit just .200 with 5 home runs (out of 16 total hits) and 11 RBI in 28 games before being traded to the New York Yankees for Al Leiter on April 30.

New York Yankees (1989–1992)
Barfield finished the 1989 season with the Yankees, and his average increased slightly to .240, with 18 home runs and 56 RBI. In 1990, he hit .246 with 25 home runs and 78 RBI, but he never produced quite like the club had hoped. In 1991, he hit just .225, although he produced 17 home runs and 48 RBI for a Yankees team that was one of the worst in recent history.

By 1992, injuries and general ineffectiveness forced his retirement at the age of 32, after he hit just .137 (13 hits in 95 at-bats) in 30 games. He was granted free agency on November 4.

While with the Yankees, Barfield was a resident of Tenafly, New Jersey.

Final years
In 1993, he played in Japan with the Yomiuri Giants, reuniting with Lloyd Moseby, but he batted just .215 in 114 games before he was released.

He joined the Houston Astros for spring training in 1994 and was projected to be the opening-day right-fielder, but injuries prevented him from making the team.

Career overview
Throughout his career, Barfield was a free swinger and racked up more than 140 strikeouts in each of five seasons (1985–1987, 1989, and 1990). For most of his time in the Major Leagues, his productivity overshadowed his strikeouts; however, by 1990, 1 in 3 Barfield at bats resulted in a strikeout.

Barfield was a career .256 hitter with 241 home runs, 716 RBI, and 39 WAR in 1,428 games. He was inducted in the Kinston Professional Baseball Hall of Fame in 1990.

Later life
His elder son, Josh, is a former infielder with the San Diego Padres and Cleveland Indians. Another son, Jeremy, was selected by the New York Mets during the 2006 draft. Jeremy opted to attend San Jacinto Community College instead and was drafted again in 2008 by the Oakland Athletics. He spent eight seasons in the Athletics' and Colorado Rockies' minor league systems and two independent leagues before joining the Boston Red Sox organization in 2017.

On August 22, 2006, the Associated Press reported that Jesse Barfield was taken to a hospital after he suffered a head injury when he was allegedly shoved down a flight of lower stairs by his son, Jeremy, during a family argument. The incident also resulted in Jeremy's arrest on a Class A misdemeanor charge of family assault.

In 2007 and 2008, Jesse Barfield served as a color commentator for Blue Jays games on CBC. Currently, he works at Competitive Edge Sports in The Woodlands, Texas.

See also

 List of Major League Baseball career home run leaders
 List of Major League Baseball annual home run leaders

References

External links

Pelota Binaria (Venezuelan Winter League)

1959 births
Living people
African-American baseball coaches
African-American baseball players
Albany-Colonie Yankees players
American expatriate baseball players in Canada
American expatriate baseball players in Japan
American League All-Stars
American League home run champions
Baseball players from Illinois
Cardenales de Lara players
American expatriate baseball players in Venezuela
Dunedin Blue Jays players
Gold Glove Award winners
Houston Astros coaches
Knoxville Blue Jays players
Major League Baseball broadcasters
Major League Baseball hitting coaches
Major League Baseball right fielders
New York Yankees players
Nippon Professional Baseball outfielders
People from Tenafly, New Jersey
Seattle Mariners coaches
Silver Slugger Award winners
Sportspeople from Joliet, Illinois
Toronto Blue Jays announcers
Toronto Blue Jays players
Utica Blue Jays players
Yomiuri Giants players
21st-century African-American people
20th-century African-American sportspeople